Bülent Tezcan (born 18 May 1965) is a Turkish lawyer and politician from the Republican People's Party (CHP) who has served as the Member of Parliament for Aydın since June 2011.

In 34th Ordinary Convention of the CHP, Bülent Tezcan was elected to the Party Council and appointed as the Vice-Chairman responsible for legal and electoral affairs in July 2012.

See also
24th Parliament of Turkey
25th Parliament of Turkey
26th Parliament of Turkey

References

External links
 MP profile on the Grand National Assembly website

Contemporary Republican People's Party (Turkey) politicians
Deputies of Aydın
Members of the 24th Parliament of Turkey
Members of the 25th Parliament of Turkey
Members of the 26th Parliament of Turkey
Living people
20th-century Turkish lawyers
People from Samsun
1965 births
Ankara University Faculty of Law alumni
21st-century Turkish lawyers